Vinothen Bede John (born 27 May 1960) is a former Sri Lankan cricketer who played in six Test matches and 45 One Day Internationals between 1982 and 1987.

Domestic career
After attending St Peter's College, Colombo, John played for the Nondescripts Cricket Club, Bloomfield Cricket and Athletic Club, Moratuwa Sports Club, Sinhalese Sports Club and continuously for over two decades in the Nationalised Services Cricket Tournament, representing the Ceylon Petroleum Corporation.

International career
John made his Test debut in Lancaster Park in New Zealand and had the scalps of  Glenn Turner and Sir Richard Hadlee. The stocky right-arm seamer opened the bowling for Sri Lanka in the eighties in Tests and ODIs.

John's Test career ended in the famous Lord's Test against England where he captured four wickets for 98 runs. He played six Tests, claiming an impressive 28 wickets (average 21.92), and took 34 ODI wickets (48.67) in 45 matches before retiring after the 1987 Cricket World Cup.

External links

1960 births
Living people
Cricketers at the 1983 Cricket World Cup
Cricketers at the 1987 Cricket World Cup
Bloomfield Cricket and Athletic Club cricketers
Moratuwa Sports Club cricketers
Nondescripts Cricket Club cricketers
Sri Lanka Test cricketers
Sri Lanka One Day International cricketers
Sri Lankan cricketers
Sinhalese Sports Club cricketers
Sri Lankan Tamil sportspeople
Alumni of St. Peter's College, Colombo